The 1925 European tour was a highlight in the history of Boca Juniors where the club toured Europe to play a series of friendly matches from March 5 to June 7, 1925, becoming the first Argentine team to play there. Boca Juniors played a total of 19 matches, 13 in Spain, 5 in Germany, and 1 in France, winning 15, with 3 losses and 1 draw. The squad scored 40 goals and conceded 16, with a win percentage of 78.95%.

The delegation included executive representatives such as vice president Adelio Cariboni and secretary Vicente Decap. The roster was Américo Tesoriere, Ludovico Bidoglio, Ramón Muttis, Segundo Médici, Alfredo Elli, Mario Busso, Domingo Tarasconi, Antonio Cerrotti, Dante Pertini, Carmelo Pozzo, Carlos Antraygues and Alfredo Garasini. Some players from other clubes were also added to the team specially for the tour, they were Manuel Seoane (El Porvenir), Cesáreo Onzari (Huracán), Luis Vaccaro (Argentinos Juniors), Octavio Díaz (Rosario Central) and Roberto Cochrane (Tiro Federal). Tarasconi and Elli were designed as managers.

Manuel Seoane was the topscorer of the tour, with 12 goals in 16 games played. Because of the successful result, the Argentine Football Association (AFA) crowned Boca Juniors as "Champion of Honor".

Background

Inspired on the recognition gained by the Uruguay national team in the 1924 Olympic Games after the squad won the tournament, the Argentine Association planned to send the Argentina national team to tour on Europe. Nevertheless, the project was not carried out so the Boca Juniors executives offered to send club's team to replace the Argentine side. The request was accepted by the AFA and Boca followed in the footsteps of Uruguayan team Nacional, that had toured Europe few months before.

The tour was organised by three representative of Spanish immigrants in Argentina, Zapater, Isasmendi and Ibáñez, becoming the first entrepreneurs in Argentine football. It is also believed that the original idea of a tour came from Natalio Botana, director of Crítica, the main newspaper by then. The club had to paid A$ 10 per each player as expenses. Finally, on February 4, 1925, the team departed to Europe boarding the De la Carrera vessel, with a large number of fans (about 10,000) saying goodbye to the players at the port. In Montevideo the delegation transhipped to a steamboat, the Formosa, which took 22 days to arrive in Vigo, Spain.

The delegation was accompanied by a Boca Juniors fan named Victoriano Caffarena, who not only financed part of the tour, but helped the players as an occasional masseur and kit manager. Caffarana was recognised as the n° 12 player (the nickname was given by Tesoriere and Cerrotti), a denomination that would be later applied to every Boca Juniors supporters.

Tour details

Spain

The first match of the tourn was on March 5, 1925, v. Celta de Vigo with an attendance of 25,000 spectators. Antonio Cerrotti opened the score with only 2' played, becoming the first Argentine footballer to score a goal in Europe. During that match, the roof of a near factory collapsed under the weight of several workers that were watching the match. Therefore, the game was suspended for 16 minutes. Boca Juniors won the match by 3–1. Three days after a second game between Boca and Celta was played, and the local team won by the same score.

After the matches v. Celta, Boca Juniors moved to La Coruña to play two games v. the local team, Deportivo de La Coruña, on March 12 and 15 respectively. Boca Juniors won the first game by 3–0 and Tesoriere became the first Argentine goalkeeper to make a save from a penalty kick. Boca also won the second test v. La Coruña by 1–0. After those victories Boca travelled to Madrid where the squad defeated Atlético de Madrid by 2–1 and three days later beat Real Madrid by 1–0. King Alfonso XIII and his son Alfonso, Prince of Asturias were among the spectators at the match. With 10' of the match played, the referee stopped the game to allow players to salute them.

The last match played by Boca Juniors in the city was against Sociedad Gimnástica Española, where Vaccaro was injured, missing the rest of the tour games.

After the games in Madrid, Boca Juniors moved to Bilbao, where the team was beat by Real Unión de Irún by 4–0 and then Athletic Bilbao by 4–2. In the game v. Athletic, the players abandoned the field as a protest for a penalty kick conceded to the local team. Nevertheless, the squad returned shortly after and the game was completed.

The tour on Spain continued in Pamplona where Boca Juniors defeated Osasuna by 1–0, finishing in Barcelona where Boca defeated RCD Espanyol twice (1–0 and 3–0) and a Catalonia combined by 2–0.

Germany and France 

Boca had planned to continue the tour on France after the last game in Spain. However, the two consecutive losses to Real Unión and Athletic Bilbao made the French organisers to turn back their decision. As a result, the team went to Munich, Germany. In that city Boca played Bayern Munich on May 9, then moving to Berlin where Boca Juniors beat Nord West. Some days later, in Leipzig, Boca achieved its largest victory of the tour when the squad thrashed SpVgg Leipzig 7–0.

Finally, the team finished the tour in Frankfurt where it played two games else. The good results in Germany made the French organisers reconsidered to play a friendly match between a French team and Boca Juniors. Therefore, the team extended the tour playing one game else, when in Paris Boca Juniors defeated a local combined by 4–2 with three goals by Manuel Seoane.

List of results 
Complete list of games and results:

Statistics

Topscorers 

Notes

Return to Argentina 
The team arrived in Buenos Aires on July 12, 1925, after a trip that took over a month. The squad was awaited by a crowd of people that received them as heroes. The Argentine Association crowned Boca Juniors as "Champion of Honor", an honorary title (unofficial) in recognition to the great campaign during the tour. Boca Juniors did not participate in the 1925 championship that was won by Huracán.

After the players came back to their clubs, Boca returned to the official competition in 1926, when the squad won the Primera División championship remaining unbeaten at the end of the tournament. Boca won 15 matches over 17 played.

Financial cost 
Despite of being successful in terms of sports results, the tour caused a large deficit in Boca Juniors' finances and was followed by a huge controversy that forced Manlio Anastasi to resign as president of the club. Nevertheless, most of blame was on club executive and businessman Félix Isasmendi. He was accused of bad negotiation so Boca Juniors earned low payments from the European clubs, apart from not taking  percentage of ticket selling.

Summarizing, Boca Juniors was paid near MN$60,000. On the other hand, costs were MN$54,000 for boat tickets and player salaries plus NN$32,000 for accommodation and trip expenses.

Social impact 
The huge success achieved by Boca Juniors brought immediate consequences for the club. The team was acclaimed by both, media and fans, gaining  recognition and popularity. Before the tour, Boca Juniors was a club that represented a neighborhood (La Boca), being considered a local team. As a result of the great campaign in Europe, Boca Juniors became a national institution, with fans through the country.

References 

T
T
B
B